Johannes Fried (born 23 May 1942, in Hamburg) is a German historian, professor, and medievalist.

Fried studied at the University of Heidelberg, where he obtained his doctorate in 1970 and his habilitation in 1977. He was professor at the University of Cologne 1980–1983 and has held the Chair of Medieval History at the University of Frankfurt am Main since 1983. He was a visiting Fellow at the Institute for Advanced Study in Princeton from 1995 to 1996.

Fried is a member of several learned societies and was president of the Verband der Historiker und Historikerinnen Deutschlands (German Society of Historians) from 1996 to 2000.

Theses 

Johannes Fried considers Notger von Lüttich, not Johannes Canaparius, to be the author of Vita sancti Adalberti episcopi Pragensis on Adalbert von Prag (* 956 – † 997), written around 1000, which for the first time mentions  Danzig (Gdansk) as "urbs Gyddanyzc".

Publications
(Only monographs are listed below)

Die Entstehung des Juristenstandes im 12. Jahrhundert. Zur sozialen und politischen Bedeutung gelehrter Juristen in Bologna und Modena, Diss. phil. Heidelberg 1970 (Forschungen zur neueren Privatrechtsgeschichte 21), Köln, Wien 1974.
Der päpstliche Schutz für Laienfürsten. Die politische Geschichte des päpstlichen Schutzprivilegs für Laien (11.-13. Jahrhundert) (Abhandlungen der Heidelberger Akademie der Wissenschaften, Phil.-hist. Kl., Jg. 1980, Nr. 1), Heidelberg 1980.
Otto III. und Boleslaw Chrobry. Das Widmungsbild des Aachener Evangeliars, der "Akt von Gnesen" und das frühe polnische und ungarische Königtum. Eine Bildanalyse und ihre historischen Folgen (Frankfurter Historische Abhandlungen 30), Stuttgart 1989. (2nd revised edition published in Stuttgart 2001.)
Die Formierung Europas 840–1046 (Oldenbourg Grundriß der Geschichte 6), München 1991, ²1993.
Der Weg in die Geschichte. Die Ursprünge Deutschlands bis 1024 (Propyläen Geschichte Deutschlands 1), Berlin 1994.
Kaiser Friedrich II. als Jäger oder ein zweites Falkenbuch Kaiser Friedrichs II. (Nachrichten der Akademie, phil.-hist. Kl. 4), Göttingen 1996. Auch erschienen in: Esculum e Federico II. L'imperatore e la città: per una rilettura dei percorsi della memoria. Atti del Convegno di studio svoltosi in occasione della nona edizione del "Premio internazionale Ascoli Piceno", Ascoli Piceno, 14–16 dicembre 1995, hg. v. Enrico Menestò, Spoleto 1998, S. 33–86
Aufstieg aus dem Untergang. Apokalyptisches Denken und die Entstehung der modernen Naturwissenschaft im Mittelalter, München 2001.
Les fruits de l'Apocalypse. Origenes de la pensée scientifique moderne au Moyen Âge. Avec une préface de Jean-Claude Schmitt, traduit par Denise Modigliani, Paris 2004.
Die Aktualität des Mittelalters. Gegen die Überheblichkeit unserer Wissensgesellschaft, Sigmaringen 2003.
Der Schleier der Erinnerung. Grundzüge einer historischen Memorik, München 2004.

Fried has also published a large number of book chapters and articles in journals.

References
Johannes Fried, official website at the University of Frankfurt am Main.

20th-century German historians
1942 births
Living people
German male non-fiction writers
21st-century German historians
Academic staff of Goethe University Frankfurt